Vivian Nasaka Makokha (born 19 December 1999), known as Vivian Nasaka, is a Kenyan footballer, who plays as a full-back for Hakkarigücü Spor in the Turkish Super League and the Kenya women's national team.

Club career 
In September 2022, she moved to Turkey and joined Hakkarigücü Spor to play in the 2022-23  Super League.

International career 
Nasaka capped for Kenya at senior level during the 2019 CECAFA Women's Championship and the 2020 Turkish Women's Cup.

See also 
List of Kenya women's international footballers

References

External links 

1999 births
Living people
Kenyan women's footballers
Kenya women's international footballers
Women's association football fullbacks
People from Kakamega
Expatriate footballers in Kenya
Kenyan expatriate sportspeople in Turkey
Expatriate women's footballers in Turkey
Turkish Women's Football Super League players
Hakkarigücü Spor players